The Cumulet is a breed of fancy pigeon. It is a strong, high-flying breed, reportedly capable of remaining on the wing for up to 14 hours. It was used for short-distance racing in England in the first half of the 1800s. Cumulet, along with other varieties of domesticated pigeons, are all descendants from the rock pigeon (Columba livia).

See also 
List of pigeon breeds

References

Pigeon breeds